Vilalta is a surname. Notable people with the surname include:

Maruxa Vilalta (1932–2014), Catalan-Mexican playwright and theater director
Xavier Vilalta (born 1980), Spanish architect and professor

Catalan-language surnames